William A. Jones also known as Bill Jones is a British writer  known as the author of MindWealth: building Personal Wealth from Intellectual Property Right. He also authored other books which have been published on various platforms.

References 

1947 births
Living people
British writers